"Mr. Jones" is a song by American hip hop recording artist Mike Jones, released as the first single from his album The American Dream. At the end of the song, Mike Jones claims that there is a film called The American Dream coming out as well as the EP. The single debuted at 92 on the Billboard Hot 100, but the following week it fell off the chart.

Music video
The video for "Mr. Jones" premiered on February 15, 2007 on BET's 106 and Park.  Bun B, Lil' Flip, DJ Drama, Letoya Luckett, Slim Thug, and King Mello, all make cameo appearances.

Remix
Rapper Lil Wayne used the music from this song, replacing Jones' lyrics with his own, and released the mix as "The Sky Is The Limit" on his 2007 mixtape Da Drought 3.

Formats and track listing
US 12"
"Mr. Jones" (Super Clean Radio Edit) – 4:02
"Mr. Jones" (Radio Edit) – 4:03
"Mr. Jones" (Instrumental) – 4:03
"Mr. Jones" (Album Version) – 4:03
"Mr. Jones" (A Cappella, Radio) – 3:56
"Mr. Jones" (A Cappella, Album) – 3:53

US CD
"Mr. Jones" (Super Clean Radio Edit) – 4:02
"Mr. Jones" (Radio Edit) – 4:03
"Mr. Jones" (Instrumental) – 4:03
"Mr. Jones" (Album Version) – 4:03
"Mr. Jones" (A Cappella) (Radio) – 3:56
"Mr. Jones" (A Cappella) (Album) – 3:53

Charts

References

2006 singles
2006 songs
Mike Jones (rapper) songs
Asylum Records singles
Warner Records singles
Songs written by Mike Jones (rapper)